New York Freedom may refer to:

New York Freedom (soccer), a defunct association football club
Freedom, New York, a town in New York State